Holzknecht is a surname. Notable people with the surname include:

Elvira Holzknecht (born 1973), Austrian luger
Guido Holzknecht (1872–1931), Austrian radiologist
Lorenzo Holzknecht (born 1984), Italian ski mountaineer
Norbert Holzknecht (born 1976), Austrian ski racer